The closed change is a Pre-Bronze, or newcomer waltz figure, performed in closed position.
Changes may start of the right foot or left foot, moving forward or backward.  This makes four different types of closed changes. Combining two changes results in a box step.
In right changes the man starts from the right foot, while in left ones the man starts from the left foot.

The figures are called "changes" because they allow dancers to change from natural turn to reverse turn (i.e., left to right turn) and vice versa. For example, a basic practising variation in waltz goes as follows:
 Dance 1–6 steps of natural turn,
then 1–3 steps of closed change from natural to reverse,
then 1–6 steps of reverse turn,
then 1–3 steps of closed change from reverse to natural,
 repeat until the music stops or partner drops.

Other change steps include the hesitation change and the outside change, described below.

Closed change from natural to reverse turn
The man steps forward on right foot while the lady steps backward on the opposing (i.e., left) foot. They will then step to the side (and possibly slightly forward, in relation to the man) on the other foot, and conclude the figure by closing the first foot beside the second. Each step takes up a full beat of the music.

There will be slight contra body movement (CBM) on 1, and sway on 2,3.

Leader (man)

Follower (lady)

Other closed changes
The closed change from reverse to natural turn is the mirror image of the move just described. Backward changes start with the leader stepping back and the follower stepping forward.

Hesitation change
The hesitation change is a Bronze syllabus figure.  The first 3 steps are identical to the natural turn.  The last 3 steps comprise the "hesitation". The leader's heel pull allows time to change directions or pause for floor craft.

Leader (man)

Outside change
The outside change is a Bronze syllabus figure.  It has regular waltz rise and fall over the three beat phrase.

Leader (man)

Follower (lady)

References

External links
Demonstration of closed changes
Demonstration of hesitation change
Demonstration of outside change

Waltz dance moves